The NeXT MegaPixel Display was a range of CRT-based computer monitors manufactured and sold by NeXT for the NeXTcube and NeXTstation workstations, designed by Hartmut Esslinger/Frog Design Inc.

Description
The original MegaPixel Display was a monochrome 17" monitor displaying 4 brightness levels (black, dark gray, light gray and white) in a fixed resolution of 1120 x 832 at 92 DPI (just shy of a true megapixel at 931,840 total pixels) at 68 Hz.

It integrated a mono microphone, mono speaker, stereo RCA sockets, a 3.5 mm headphone socket and a socket for  the keyboard (which in turn provided a socket for the mouse). A unique feature was that the monitor was connected to the computer by a single 6 foot cable which provided power, video signals and the aforementioned signals.

A severe problem with this setup was that the monitor could not be switched off completely while the computer was powered on. The screen could be switched black but the cathode heater always remained on. This led to extreme screen dimming after some years of use, especially when the computer was not turned off overnight as in a server setup or in a busy software lab.

This problem was later rectified with the now ultra rare 4000A model rated at 10,000 hours (~14 months).

The display has a stand that allows it to be tilted. The stand also features two rollers that can be used to move the monitor back and forth despite its heavy weight. The stand also provides a place for the keyboard when not in use, freeing up the (real) desktop in front.

When the NeXTstation Color and the NeXTdimension board was released, NeXT sold rebranded color monitors (e.g. Sony Trinitron) with 13W3 connectors as MegaPixel Color Display in either 17" or 21".  Remaining connections (formerly built into the MegaPixel Display) were provided via a DB-19 Y-cable to a separate box, the NeXT Sound Box.

Specifications

from the NeXT User's Reference

Monitor
 17-inch monochrome
 Flat screen
 1120 x 832 x 2 resolution (92 dpi)
 Four colors (black and white and two levels of gray)
 Refresh rate of 68 Hz noninterlaced
 Integrated tilt and roll

Interfaces
 Keyboard jack
 8-bit, 8012.8 Hz analog to digital input via microphone miniphone jack (mono)
 16-bit, 44.1 kHz stereo digital-to-analog converter
 output via:
 Headphone miniphone jack (stereo)
 Gold plated RCA line-out jacks (stereo)
 Integrated speaker (mono)

Keyboard and Mouse
 85 keys including:
 cursor keys, numeric pad
 Monitor brightness, sound volume
 Power on/off
 Two button opto mechanical Mouse

Dimensions
 16 in. (w) x 17.3 (h) x 14 (d)
 408 mm (w) x 440 (h) x 354 (d)
 50 lbs. (23 kg)

References

External links
 NeXTComputers.org
 US Patent D312,629 monitor design
 US Patent D312,630 monitor and stand design
 US Patent D317,760 stand design
 US Patent D317,291 cable design

Computer monitors
NeXT